Bell Records was an American record label founded in 1952 in New York City by Arthur Shimkin, the owner of the children's record label Golden Records, and initially a unit of Pocket Books, after the rights to the name were acquired from Benny Bell who used the Bell name to issue risque novelty records. A British branch was also active in the 1960s and 1970s. Bell Records was shut down in late 1974, and its assets were transferred to Columbia Pictures' new label, Arista Records.

1950s

At its inception in 1952, Bell specialized in budget generic pop music, with the slogan "music for the millions". Originally sold on seven-inch 78rpm and 45rpm records for 39 cents (US), this style of music went out of fashion as rock and roll became more prevalent. Sound-alike cover versions of hit records were also issued on 78rpm as well as 45rpm disks priced at 49 cents.

One of these records was by "Tom & Jerry" who would later become known using their real surnames, Simon & Garfunkel.

Instead of being pressed into vinyl like a normal 7-inch disc, these records were injection molded by Bestway Products using polystyrene, which either had glued-on labels or the label information was printed directly on the polystyrene, rendering many copies almost unreadable years later. Most (but not all) Bell and associated label 45rpm records were similarly injection-molded all the way into the 1970s.

As Al Massler, the head of record manufacturer Bestway Products, had become head of Bell Records in 1959, Mala Records was then formed as a Bell subsidiary label, specializing in rock and roll along with rhythm and blues.

1960s

In 1960, Amy Records was formed as another subsidiary label, focusing on soul and/or blue-eyed soul acts. The following year, Larry Uttal folded his Madison Records label into Bell after purchasing the label, along with its Amy and Mala subsidiary labels. Concentrating his efforts on the Amy and Mala labels, Uttal rendered the Bell parent label dormant until 1964, when the label was revived, featuring a logo utilizing a stylized "BELL" word mark shaped like a bell.

In 1966, the Bell label was expanded internationally and the company decided to issue all their albums, even for Amy and Mala acts, on the Bell label, and went on to issue several hit singles, including: "Little Girl" by Syndicate of Sound (#5 CB/#8 BB), "I'm Your Puppet" by James and Bobby Purify in 1966, "The Letter" by the Box Tops (the single on Mala, the album on Bell) in 1967, "Angel of the Morning" by Merrilee Rush & the Turnabouts in 1968, and "Gimme Gimme Good Lovin'" by Crazy Elephant in 1969.

In March 1969, Columbia Pictures Industries (CPI) purchased Bell for $3.5 million (mainly in CPI stock), retaining Larry Uttal as label president. Later that year, the Mala, Amy, and Bell labels were merged into a single unit, keeping the Bell moniker. By mid-1971, the assets of the Columbia Pictures owned, but RCA Records distributed, Colgems Records were integrated into the label. Uttal was instrumental in signing many soon-to-be-famous acts such as the Partridge Family, David Cassidy, Ricky Segall, the 5th Dimension, Barry Manilow, Melissa Manchester and Tony Orlando & Dawn, as well as adopting a new "thick-stripe" logo.

1970s

By 1970, the Bell label was more successful with pop music singles, and less successful with more lucrative pop LPs. After a year of declining revenues, Uttal resigned from Bell at the end of May 1974 to begin his own label, Private Stock, financed and distributed outside North America by EMI. Uttal was replaced as president a week later by Clive Davis, who had originally been hired as a record and music consultant by Columbia Pictures.  Davis's real goal was to reorganize and revitalize Columbia Pictures's music division. With a $10 million investment by CPI, and a reorganization of the various Columbia Pictures legacy labels (Colpix, Colgems, and Bell), Davis introduced Columbia Pictures's new record division, Arista Records, in November 1974 with Davis himself owning 20% of the new venture.

Bell had its final No. 1 hit in January 1975 with Barry Manilow's "Mandy" (Bell 45,613), followed shortly by the label's final hit, as well as its final single, "Look in My Eyes Pretty Woman" by Tony Orlando and Dawn (Bell 45,620—US #11) after which the more successful Bell albums were reissued on Arista. The last releases utilizing the Bell imprint have the designation "Bell Records, Distributed by Arista Records, 1776 Broadway, New York City 10019" around the rim of the label.

Bell Records also had a division in Japan that was notable for reissuing Colgems original recordings, most notably the Monkees, who enjoyed considerable success in the country well into the 1970s. In 1974, while the US Bell label released Re-Focus (a greatest hits compilation that was subsequently re-released several times on the Arista label as "The Monkees Greatest Hits"), The Japanese Bell label re-released the entire original Colgems LP catalog along with EP's, Box Sets and several Greatest Hits collections (including Re-Focus). While Bell Japan ignored the original Colgems single releases, they did however release the last single recorded by Davy Jones and Micky Dolenz ("Do it in the name of love"/"Lady Jane") as "the Monkees" unlike Bell in the US and UK, who opted to use their individual names. In 1973, Bell Japan also utilized the "Gold Disc" subsidiary label to release the 45 single "(Theme from) The Monkees"/"Daydream Believer" (released in the US on the Arista label). The third and final Monkees 45 released in 1973 featured the songs "I Wanna Be Free"/"Take A Giant Step".

Bell Records UK 
The British branch was established in 1967. Previous British releases of Bell recordings were issued on EMI's Stateside Records. Bell/Amy/Mala's association with EMI dates back to 1964. Bell Records UK was opened as an independent label on January 1, 1972 in London, headed by Dick Leahy (general manager of the British branch in the previous year), continuing a three-year pressing and distribution agreement with EMI. (In other countries, apart from the United States, Polydor handled distribution which later picked up British distribution.) Artists signed to them included the Bay City Rollers, Showaddywaddy, The Glitter Band, and American acts Reparata and the Delrons and The Partridge Family with David Cassidy. Other artists on the label included Gary Glitter, Edison Lighthouse (who, along with Glitter, signed to Bell UK thanks to a deal with Laurence Myers's Gem Records,) Barry Blue, Barry Manilow, Terry Jacks, Hello, The Piglets, The Pearls and Harley Quinne, The Drifters, and the UK releases of The Box Tops.

Bell UK initially kept its identity when the American label was reorganized into Arista in 1974, but a year later the UK label adopted the Arista name, although releases continued on the UK Bell label until 1976. Showaddywaddy released the last Bell single, "Under the Moon of Love", which reached No.1 in December 1976, before Arista UK briefly revived the label in 1981. The Bell logo has made occasional appearances on the jackets and labels of Arista UK releases.

Current ownership 
The former catalog of Bell Records and its related labels is now owned by Sony Music Entertainment (now a sister company of Columbia Pictures) and managed by Legacy Recordings.

Subsidiary and associated labels

In addition to releasing their own records, Bell Records distributed at least five dozen custom labels throughout its existence.  Among the most familiar labels are:

Big Tree Records
Philly Groove Records
Mala Records (Bell-owned)
Amy Records (Bell-owned)
Bigtop Records (Brief reactivation under Bell in the mid 60s)
Carousel Records
Crewe Records
Direction Records
DynoVoice Records
NewVoice Records
Page One Records
Penny Farthing Records 
Pye RecordsThe above three labels were U.S. distribution arms of the major U.K. companies
Rocky Road Records
TA Records (Talent Associates)
Windfall Records

Other affiliated labels (in which many released no more than two to 10 singles) included: Academy, Admiral, AGP, Amos, Aquarian, Audio Arts!, Aurora, Bell Country Series, Big Hill, Brookmont, Canusa, Carnation, Chariot, Creative Funk, Cyclone, D.C. Sound, December, DJM, E Records, Elf, Eskee, Gemini Star, General International, Gold Records Incorporated, Goldwax, Hilltop, Hot Line Music Journal, Ivanhoe, JED, Jet Set, Kayman, Kas-Mo, Kingston, Lake, LHI (Lee Hazlewood Industries), Luv, Mona-Lee, Musicland U.S.A., Maxx, New World, Nite Life, Norman, Pacemaker, Pala, Philly Soulville, Philtown, Rain, Roc-Ker, Rotate, Round, Sansu, Show Biz, Simco, Sport, Stere-O-Craft, Sunburst, Taurus, Timmy, Tou-Sea, Twin Stacks, Vando, Village Gate, York, and Zorro.

Reissue labels
Bell also had three oldies reissue labels in its history:
Flashback Records: Started in 1964 and continued after the Bell/Arista transformation
Sphere Sound Records (1965–1970): Released reissue singles as well as albums with previously issued and unreleased tracks
Bell Gold Records (1972): Short-lived label consisting of hits from artists the 5th Dimension and Al Wilson, both of whom were on Soul City which was sold to Bell

Bell Records artists (1960s)
The following artists have had at least one recording released on the Bell Records label or one of its subsidiaries.

(In alphabetical order)

Cilla Black
The Box Tops (Mala, Bell)
Solomon Burke
Crazy Elephant
Bette Davis
The Delfonics (Philly Groove)
The Enchanted Forest (Amy)
Lee Dorsey (Amy)
Georgia Gibbs
Al Green
Margo Guryan
O'Jays
James & Bobby Purify
Reparata and the Delrons
Ronny & the Daytonas (Mala)
Merrilee Rush (Bell, AGP)
Del Shannon (Amy)  
Smokestack Lightning
Spooky Tooth (US only)
Syndicate of Sound
Jimmy Velvit (as James Bell)

Bell Records artists (1970s)

April Wine (Big Tree)
Miki Antony
Baja Marimba Band
Bay City Rollers
Barry Blue
Brownsville Station (Big Tree)
Burl Ives
David Cassidy
Climax (Carousel, Rocky Road)
Tony Orlando and Dawn
The Drifters
Dusk
Edison Lighthouse
The Fantastics
The 5th Dimension
First Choice (Philly Groove)
Micky Dolenz
Cheryl Ernst (Cheryl Ernst Wells)
David Geddes (Big Tree)
Gary Glitter
The Glitter Band
Godspell Off-Broadway soundtrack
Godspell movie soundtrack
Let the Good Times Roll soundtrack
Gryphon (US and Canada only)
Hello
Lost Horizon (1973) movie soundtrack
Terry Jacks
Davy Jones
Shirley Jones
Vicki Lawrence
Leapy Lee
Lobo (Big Tree)
Melissa Manchester
Barry Manilow
Michael McDonald
Sylvia McNeill
Peter Noone
The Partridge Family
Sergio Mendes & Brasil '77
Suzi Quatro
Rodney Allen Rippy
 Ricky Segall
Showaddywaddy
Labi Siffre
The Monkees (Re-Focus LP in USA, Colgems re-releases and compilations in Japan)
The Stampeders
The Sweet
Marlo Thomas
Al Wilson (Rocky Road)
Lenny Zakatek

See also
 Arista Records
 List of record labels

References

External links
 
 The Bell/Amy/Mala story from Both Sides Now Publications
 Early Bell recordings
 1950s Bell 45rpm discography
 1960s Bell 45rpm discography
 Vinyl Tap Records UK Bell discography, including later releases

American record labels
Arista Records
Columbia Pictures
British record labels
Record labels established in 1952
Record labels disestablished in 1974